Samar Matoussi (born February 4, 1993) is a Tunisian actress, presenter, and model who started her career in 2016.

Filmography 

 Lilia, a Tunisian Girl (2016)
 Another Life (2016–2018)
 El Manda (2020)
 The Island of Forgiveness (2021)

References

External links 

 

1993 births
Living people
Tunisian film actresses
21st-century Tunisian actresses